Bjur is a surname. Notable people with the surname include:

Jan Bjur (born 1965), Danish footballer
Ole Bjur (born 1968), Danish footballer
Peter Bjur (born 2000), Danish footballer, son of Ole

Danish-language surnames